This is a list of notable Ghanaian actors listed in alphabetic order by surname.

A
 Augustine Abbey (Idikoko)
 Ama K. Abebrese (born 1980)
 Mavis Adjei - starred in over 25 films, currently based in the Netherlands
 Kofi Adu (Agya Koo) (born 1968)
 Freema Agyeman (born 1979), British actor of Ghanaian and Iranian descent
 Jackie Appiah (born 1983)
 Mac Jordan Amartey (1936-2018)
 Fred Amugi (born 1948)
 Martha Ankomah (born 1985)
 John Apea
 Gyearbuor Asante (1941–2000)
 Juliet Asante
 Abraham Attah (born 2001)
 Chris Attoh (born 1979)
 Akorfa Edjeani-Asiedu (born 1969)

B

Robert Bathurst (born 1957), British actor born in Ghana
Michael Blackson (born 1972), comedian and actor
Kwesi Boakye (born 1999)
Adeline Ama Buabeng
Nadia Buari (born 1982)
Charles Kofi Bucknor (1953–2017)
Moesha Buduong (born 1990)
Akosua Busia (born 1966)

C 
 Omar Sheriff Captan
 Michaela Coel (born 1987)

D

 Kojo Dadson
 Paul Danquah (1925–2015), British actor of Ghanaian heritage
 David Oscar Dogbe (born 1984)
 Ebenezer Donkor (1938–2016)
 David Dontoh (born 1964/65)
 Joselyn Dumas (born 1980)
 John Dumelo (born 1984)

E
 Pascaline Edwards (born 1970)
 Christabel Ekeh (born 1990)
 Idris Elba (born 1972), British actor of Ghanaian and Sierra Leonean descent

F

 Souad Faress (born 1948)
 Lydia Forson (born 1984)

G
 Dzifa Gomashie

H
 Kobna Holdbrook-Smith

I

 Juliet Ibrahim (born 1986) 
Selassie Ibrahim

J

 Ian Jazzi (born 1986)

K

 King Aboagye Brenya (died 2021)

Kwame Owusu Ansah

L 
 Harry Laud
 Lilian Bach

M
 Nana Ama McBrown (born 1973)
 Peter Mensah (born 1959)
 Majid Michel (born 1980)
 Salma Mumin

N

 Eddie Nartey (born 1984)
 Yvonne Nelson (born 1985)
 Kwadwo Nkansah (born 1987) (Lilwin)
 Grace Nortey
 Nana Ama McBrown

O 

 Yvonne Okoro (born 1984)
 Grace Omaboe (born 1946)
 Mikki Osei Berko (born 1973)
 Joseph Otsiman (born 1989)

P

Q
 Margaret Quainoo (1941-2006)
 Hugh Quarshie (born 1954)

R 
 Brew Riverson Jnr

S
 Abdul Salis (born 1979), actor, comedian
 Sam Sarpong (1975–2015)
 Kwaku Sintim-Misa (born 1956)

Suzy Williams

T
 Reggie Tsiboe (born 1950)

V

 Van Vicker (born 1977)

W
 George Williams (1929–2016)
 Suzzy Williams (1981/82-2005), worked in Ghana and Nigeria

Y

 Reggie Yates (born 1983), English actor of Ghanaian descent
 Prince Yawson (Waakye)
 Vicky Zugah

References

Ghana
Actors